Operação Triunfo (OT) is the Portuguese version of the original Star Academy (in the original Spanish version of the reality show Operación Triunfo broadcast by RTP). The first two seasons were hosted by Catarina Furtado, and the other two seasons were presented by Sílvia Alberto.

The Portuguese version follows the regular format, with the 12-20 students being put into a music academy and training songs for a week, and singing in the "Gala" at the end of the week, usually on Saturdays. A jury composed by four personalities of the music world will judge the students performances and nominate four of them. Of those four, one is saved by the professors and another is saved by the students. The two remaining students are up for elimination. In the following week, one of the two nominees is saved. Also there is a public vote to decide the "Favourite of the Week". That person is automatically saved from nomination.

The inaugural season took started in 2003. The final season was Operação Triunfo 2010.

Operação Triunfo 1
The first edition started in February 2003 and ended on 1 June. The winner was Sofia Barbosa.

Operação Triunfo 2
The 2nd season started on 28 September 2003 and ended on 25 January 2004.

Operação Triunfo 3
The third season started on 22 September 2007 and ended on 19 January 2008.

Operação Triunfo 2010

The fourth and final season was the first to introduce the showing of the castings. The casting phase started on 16 October 2010 and the Galas phase started on 6 November 2010.

References

Star Academy
Portuguese reality television series
2003 Portuguese television series debuts
2011 Portuguese television series endings
2000s Portuguese television series
2010s Portuguese television series